The Mizo National Front uprising was a revolt against the government of India aimed at establishing a sovereign nation state for the Mizo people, which started on 28 February 1966. On 1 March 1966, the Mizo National Front (MNF) made a declaration of independence, after launching coordinated attacks on the Government offices and security forces post in different parts of the Mizo district in Assam. The government retaliated and recaptured all the places seized by the MNF by 25 March 1966.

In the initial response of the government operations to suppress the rebellion in 1966, the Indian Air Force carried out airstrikes in Aizawl; this remains the only instance of India carrying out an airstrike in its own civilian territory. Counter-insurgency operations continued over the next two decades, although the intensity of the rebellion diminished over time progressively. In 1986, the government and the MNF signed the Mizoram Peace Accord, thereby ending the rebellion.

Background 
Before the formation of the Mizoram state in 1987, the Mizo-dominated areas in India were a part of the Mizo district of the Assam state. The Mizo organisations, including the Mizo Union, had long complained of step-motherly treatment at the hands of the Assam Government, and demanded a separate state for the Mizos.

Every 48 years, a cyclic ecological phenomenon called Mautam leads to widespread famine in this region. When such a famine started in 1959, the Mizos were left disappointed by the Assam Government's handling of the situation. The introduction of Assamese as the official language of the state in 1960, without any consideration for the Mizo language, led to further discontent and protests.

The growing discontent with the Government ultimately resulted in a secessionist movement led by Mizo National Front (MNF), an organisation that had evolved out of a famine relief team. While the Mizo Union's demand was limited to a separate state for the Mizos within India, the MNF aimed at establishing a sovereign independent nation for the Mizos.

MNF's plan for armed uprising 
The extremist section within MNF advocated the use of violence to seek independence from India. A special armed wing called the Mizo National Army (MNA) was created for the purpose. The MNA consisted of eight infantry "battalions" organised on the pattern of the Indian army. One of the battalions was named after Joshua, while the rest were named after the legendary Mizo heroes: Chawngbawla, Khuangchera, Lalvunga, Saizahawla, Taitesena, Vanapa and Zampui Manga. The Lion Brigade (Chawngbawla, Khuangchera, Saizahawla and Taitesena battalions) operated in the northern half of the district, while the Dagger Brigade (Joshua, Lalvunga, Vanapa and Zampui Manga) operated in its southern half. MNA consisted of around 2000 men, supported by another group called the Mizo National Volunteers (MNV), which comprised an equal number of irregulars.

In the early 1960s, the MNF leaders including Pu Laldenga visited East Pakistan (now Bangladesh), where the Government of Pakistan offered them supply of military hardware and training. Laldenga and his lieutenant Pu Lalnunmawia were arrested by the Government of Assam on the charge of conspiring against the nation, but were released in February 1964 after an undertaking of good conduct by Laldenga. However, shortly after their release, MNF intensified its secessionist activities. The MNF members forcibly collected donations from the Mizo people, recruited volunteers and trained them with arms supplied by Pakistan. By the end of 1965, the MNF weapon cache consisted of the plastic explosives stolen from the Border Roads Organisation, rifles and ammunition obtained from the 1st Battalion, Assam Rifles (1 AR) headquartered at Aizawl, crude bombs and Sten guns.

The Indian armed forces, fresh from the Sino-Indian War of 1962 and the Indo-Pakistani War of 1965, were focused on the Indo-Pakistan and Indo-China borders. The extremist MNF leaders wanted to take advantage of this situation by starting an armed rebellion to establish an independent Mizo nation. The rehabilitation of the pro-government Chakma refugees from East Pakistan in the Mizo district further instigated them.

Accordingly, a plan (codenamed "Operation Jericho") was created to systematically capture the power in the Mizo district. The MNF aimed at taking over the treasuries and the petrol pumps, neutralising the police force and capturing all the important non-Mizo ("Vai") officials. The MNF flag was to be hoisted at Aizawl on 1 March 1966, followed by a victory parade on 2 March 1966. The MNF arsenal would be supplemented by capturing the armouries of 1 AR, the Border Security Force (BSF) and the local police. The MNF leaders had hoped that they would have a large number of sympathisers among the local police, the government officials and the AR, which would make the takeover peaceful. They also hoped that if they could keep their flag flying in Aizawl for 48 hours, other countries such as Pakistan would recognise the Mizo territory as a sovereign nation and take up their case in the United Nations. The volunteers and the sympathisers of MNF were promised a prosperous future in the proposed sovereign state.

The plan was kept in strict secrecy. As a cover, the MNF leaders indulged in public propaganda advocating use of "non-violent means" to achieve independence for Mizos. The MNF commander Lt. Col. Laimana, who was suspected of being a government informant, was assassinated on 1 January 1966.

On 27 February 1966, Pu Laldenga and some other MNF leaders decided that the armed insurrection would start on 1 March. The instructions were sent to launch simultaneous attacks on the posts of the 1st AR and the BSF. In case the attack failed, an alternate plan of concentrating near the Indo-Pak border was also made.

The government authorities did get some indications of the upcoming armed action, but failed to anticipate its intensity. On the night of 27 February, Rokima, the brother of the MNF lieutenant Pu Lalnunmawia was killed in an apparently accidental blast, which was noticed by the AR personnel. All AR posts were alerted to keep a watch on the movements of MNF members.

Armed action by MNF 

The security forces stationed in the Mizo Hills district included the 1st Battalion, Assam Rifles (1 AR) headquartered at Aizawl, the 5th Battalion, Border Security Force (5 BSF) and the local police. On the night of 28 February/1 March 1966, the MNF launched a series of simultaneous attacks on the 1 AR garrisons at Aizawl, Lunglei and Champhai and the 5 BSF posts at Chawngte, Demagiri, Hnahlan, Marpara, Tipaimukh, Tuipang, Tuipuibari, Vaphai and Vaseitlang.

Lunglei 
The first attack by MNF began at about 10:30 pm IST on 28 February 1966, at the sub-treasury at Lunglei. A group 500–1000 strong attacked the camp of the security forces and the AR post. The attack was repulsed, leaving two AR personnel and a few MNF militants dead, and three more AR personnel wounded. The AR camp was surrounded and starved by the MNF militants for three days. The IAF Helicopter at last flew over the camp to supply the prior needs of Assam Rifles. On 5 March, the insurgents kidnapped R.V. Pillai, the Sub-divisional Officer. By 7 March, they had captured the AR post as well as the Border Roads Task Force camp at Lunglei.

Aizawl 
The MNF insurgents entered Aizawl on the night of 28 February 1966. The same day, the Mizo district administration came across the copies of the two-page declaration of independence distributed among the MNF leaders. Since the insurgents had cut all the telephone lines, the local authorities could not seek immediate help from Shillong or Silchar. Later, the commanding officer of the Border Roads Organisation managed to send a wireless message to Silchar.

At 02:00 IST, on 1 March 1966, the insurgents attacked the telephone exchange at Aizawl. An hour later, around 150 insurgents led by Pu Lalnundawta, attacked the Aizawl District Treasury and looted money, arms and .303 ammunition. Within a few hours, the insurgents took control of all the important centres of the Mizo district, paralysing the civil administration. They also seized all the vehicles in the town. The law and order situation went beyond the control of the local Police and the small units of AR posted in the district. T S Gill, the Deputy Commissioner of the Mizo district, took shelter in the AR headquarters. The insurgents attacked the 1 AR headquarters in Aizawl unsuccessfully. They also attacked the AR post at Chhimluang on the Aizawl-Silchar road, but were repulsed by the Riflemen. To stop any reinforcements from Silchar, they created several roadblocks and damaged the only bridge on the road.

Around this time, several MNF leaders had gathered in Aizawl on the pretext of a General Assembly. A few of the MNF leaders strongly opposed the violence, and asked Laldenga to withdraw his orders for an armed action. However, it was too late to discontinue the operation, as the rebels had already attacked multiple places including Lunglei, Champhai and Demagiri.

On 1 March, Laldenga made a declaration of independence, and exhorted all the Mizos to join the revolt against the "illegal Indian occupation" of the Mizo territory.

On 2 March, the insurgents ambushed a patrol of 1 AR, and inflicted heavy casualties on them. After 1 AR at Aizawl refused to surrender, the MNF suicide squad launched an attack on them at 9:00 on 4 March. They lost 13 men in a counter-attack by the Assam Rifles soldiers. Two helicopters with reserves, ammunition and water sent by the Government to help the Riflemen could not land due to constant firing by the insurgents. Some of the air drops meant for the riflemen fell into the hands of MNF members.

The same day, the insurgents released all the prisoners from the Aizawl jail, who looted the shops of the non-Mizos ("Vai"s), and also burned several huts in the Aizawl bazaar. Due to the AR's refusal to surrender, the victory parade proposed to be held on 2 March was postponed to 10 March.

On 5 March, the insurgents led by Pu Hruaia plundered the Public Works Department office in Aizawl, looting items for the "Mizoram Sawrkar" ("Mizoram Government") Office. On 11 March, the insurgents burned the houses of the senior officials of the Mizo Union.

Other places 
At about 01:30 IST on 1 March 1966, around 150 insurgents armed with lathis surrounded the sub-divisional officer of the Public Works Department at Vairengte and asked him to get out of the district. They also took over the departmental stores and the jeep. Similar incidents were reported from Coinluang and Chawngte. On the same day, the insurgents easily captured the AR post at Champhai, with help from their sympathisers in the security forces.

At Kolasib, the insurgents took around 250 civil officials, the policemen, the intelligence personnel and the road builders as captives, and kept them without food and water. The women and children were also taken as captives and kept separately in a small building. None of the civilian officials and government servants were hurt, as MNF expected their support in running the administration of the proposed sovereign state.

Government response 
According to a statement made by the Chief Minister of Assam Bimala Prasad Chaliha, on 1 March, the insurgents who attacked the Aizawl treasury and Lunglei numbered around 10,000. The Indian Home Minister Gulzari Lal Nanda, in the Indian parliament on 3 March, stated the total number of rebels in Aizawl, Lunglei, Vairengte, Chawngte and Chhimluang as 800–1300.

On 2 March 1966, the Government of Assam invoked the Assam Disturbed Areas Act, 1955 and the Armed Forces (Special Powers) Act, 1958, proclaiming the entire Mizo district as "disturbed". Bimala Prasad Chaliha condemned Laldenga for his "betrayal", while Gulzari Lal Nanda promised "stern action" with "all the force" at the Government's command. A 24-hour curfew was imposed in Aizawl on 3 March, and reinforcements were sent for 1 AR by helicopters.

Airstrikes 
The IAF was asked to carry the troops in Mi-4 helicopters into the besieged AR camp, accompanied with fighter escorts, but failed due to heavy and accurate fire by the insurgents. The Toofani fighters of 29 Squadron operating from Kumbhirgram and Hunter fighters of 17 Squadron operating from Jorhat undertook independent missions to escort the troop reinforcements and to suppress the insurgents. Later, when the GOC Eastern Command, Lt. Gen. Sam Manekshaw, flew over parts of Mizoram in 1968, his helicopter was fired at by the insurgents.

On the afternoon of 4 March 1966, the IAF jet fighters strafed the MNF targets in Aizawl using machine guns, allegedly causing few civilian casualties. The next day, a more extensive airstrike was carried out for about five hours. According to some Mizos, the planes used incendiary bombs, resulting in fires that destroyed several houses in the Dawrpui and Chhinga Veng areas. According to some other accounts, the houses were destroyed in the fires started by the prisoners released from the Aizawl jail by the insurgents. Apart from Aizawl, the neighbouring villages of Tualbung and Hnahlan were also allegedly bombarded. Most of the civilian population fled Aizawl, and took refuge in the remote villages in the adjacent hills.

In the history of independent India, this remains the only instance of the Government of India resorting to air strikes in its own territory. Locals claim that Rajesh Pilot and Suresh Kalmadi were among the IAF pilots who dropped the bombs. Pu Zoramthanga, who went on to become the Chief Minister of Mizoram in 1998, once said that the main reason he joined the MNF and became a rebel was the "relentless bombing of Aizawl in 1966". The people of Mizoram now observe Zoram Ni ("Zoram Day") to commemorate the air raids.

Ground operations 
The operations were overseen by HQ Eastern Command under Lt. Gen. Sam Manekshaw. The local responsibility for the army operations was given to 101 Communication Zone under Maj. Gen. Sagat Singh. 311 (Independent) Infantry Brigade was located at that point of time in Silchar. An additional formation, 61 Mountain Brigade (under Brig. R.Z. Kabraji) was moved from Agartala to Aizawl. Subsequently, a regular division, HQ 57 Mountain Division was raised at Masimpur, near Silchar which oversaw counter-insurgency operations in Mizoram in the later stages. The leading battalion of 61 Mountain Brigade, the 8th battalion, Sikh Regiment (8 Sikh) advanced from Silchar into the disturbed area on 3 March. The forces could reach Aizawl only on 6 March, due to the roadblocks caused by the militants. On 7 March, they relieved the besieged AR garrison at Aizawl. On 8 March, the 2nd battalion, 11 Gorkha Rifles (2/11 GR) moved towards Champhai and the 3rd battalion, Bihar Regiment (3 Bihar) towards Lunglei. By 15 March, all of 61 Brigade with its four battalions and supporting arms and services had moved into Mizoram and by the end of the month had regained control of Mizoram.

Withdrawal of MNF forces 
The insurgents had managed to capture all the posts of 1 AR except their headquarters at Aizawl. Their chances of capturing the AR headquarters were low after the IAF airstrikes. When the MNF leaders heard about the likely arrival of the Indian Army in Aizawl on 7 March, they decided to retreat to Lunglei, which was under the MNF control.

The security forces threatened to bomb Lunglei, but two Christian clergymen – H. S. Luaia and Pastor C.L. Hminga – requested them to avoid it in order to prevent loss of civilian lives. The two also persuaded the MNF not to attack the army. After some resistance, the MNF rebels withdrew from Lunglei on 13 March, taking away some arms, ammunition and vehicles with them. The security forces secured Lunglei on 14 March, and Champhai on 15 March. The 5th battalion, Parachute Regiment (5 Para), was flown in by helicopters to Lunglei on 14–15 March, set out for Demagiri and secured it on 17 March. By the 25th, all the important towns and the posts had been freed from the MNF control.

By the end of March 1966, the Indian security forces had captured 467 muzzle loading guns, 332 shotguns, 175 rifles, 57 pistols/revolvers and about 70,000 rounds of ammunition from MNF. However, MNF had also managed to obtain a large amount of ammunition from the captured security forces posts. Its weapon cache consisted of: around 1500 shotguns, 600 rifles (mostly .303 bore), 75 sten-guns, 30 revolvers/pistols, 25 carbines and 20 light machine guns.

The MNA headquarters, originally located in Aizawl was moved multiple times during the conflict: first to South Hlimen (on 3 March), then to Reiek (on 18 March) and finally to the Chittagong Hill Tracts in East Pakistan.

Insurgency 
The Mizo Union leaders blamed the MNF for the loss of civilian life, and condemned the armed insurrection. The MNF accused the Indian Government of "indiscriminate bombing on civilian population" during the airstrikes in Aizawl. Two MLAs of the Assam state, Stanley DD Nichols Roy and Hoover H Hynniewta, visited the Mizo district to take a stock of the situation. Later in April, Roy moved a motion in the Assam Legislative Assembly on the Aizawl air attack, calling the use of air force "excessive".

By the end of 1966, reinforcements were sent to the district by the Government in form of:
 two Indian Army battalions
 18th battalion, Punjab Regiment (18 Punjab)
 9th battalion, Bihar Regiment (9 Bihar)
 three Assam Rifles battalions (6th, 18th and 19th)
 four armed police battalions of the Central Reserve Police Force (CRPF)

The MNF insurgents dispersed in smaller units, merged with the local population and continued to carry out armed attacks against the security forces in the district. The villagers suffered from both sides as the insurgents would kill those resisting their entry into the villages while the villages suffered reprisals from the security forces in case ambushes had taken place in their vicinity.

The Mizo National Front was outlawed in 1967. The same year, the Counterinsurgency and Jungle Warfare School was set up at Vairengte to train the soldiers in fighting with the rebels in the North-East India.

As the insurgents found security and refuge in the large number of tiny hamlets from which they would launch attacks on the patrols of the security forces and later merge into the civilian population, the military need was felt to deny the militants access to the common people. To solve the problem, the Government of India resorted to a "grouping" policy in the Mizo district, starting in January 1967. Under the grouping policy, nearly 80% of the rural population was shifted from their villages and resettled along the highways. The old villages were burnt, and the new settlements were kept under the control of the security forces until 1970. The Indian Army got greater freedom of action and succeeded in isolating the insurgents from the people and cutting the insurgents' supply chain. This grouping of villages resulted in a great deal of suffering for the indigenous populace as their farms and houses were burnt and they could not have enough farmland while being interred into these camps. Farming output went down a cliff and people had to face near-famine conditions. This grouping has also been said to be the beginning of social evils in Mizoram.  The villagers were forced to move to these camps and agreement papers were often signed at gunpoint. While insurgency continued at lower levels, the space for political negotiations was created and led to Mizoram becoming a Union Territory and the entry of the MNF into mainstream politics.

In August 1968, the Government of India offered amnesty to the insurgents, which resulted in the surrender of 1524 MNF members. This was followed by more amnesty offers during 1969–70. In 1976, Laldenga was called to New Delhi for peace talks with the government. Failure on the terms of the negotiation led to banning of MNF in January 1982. Along with some relatives, Ladenga was arrested and expatriated in April.

Later, the Mizo Union's negotiations with the Union Government resulted in the Mizo district gaining the status of a Union Territory as "Mizoram" on 21 January 1972. MNF's secessionist movement came to an end in 1986, when it signed the Mizo accord with the Government of India. The Government agreed to create a separate state for the Mizos called Mizoram, with Aizawl as its capital. MNF, in return, decided to give up its secessionist demand and the use of violence.

Remembrances 

 20 February, the "State Day" is an annual public holiday in Mizoram.
 1 March, the day of declaration of independence, is commemorated by MNF as "Mizo National Day."
 5 March, the day of major bombarding in 1966, is known as "Zoram Ni" (the day of Zoram).
 30 June, the day of signing the Mizo peace accord in 1986, is officially observed by the government of Mizoram as "Remna Ni" (the day of peace).
 20 September is observed by MNF as the "Martyr's Day" to memorialise the deaths of MNF soldiers during the insurgency period.

See also 
 Insurgency in Northeast India

References

External links 
 The Mizo Uprising: Assam Assembly Debates on the Mizo Movement, 1966-1971 by Dr. J. V. Hluna and Rini Tochhawng, Cambridge Scholars Publishing

History of Mizoram
Rebellions in India
Separatism in India
Conflicts in 1966
1966 in India
Mizo